The Political Prisoners Foundation is a governmental institution of the Iraqi Council of Ministers, established in 2005 to deal with the general situation of political prisoners and detainees before 2003 and to compensate them financially and morally, currently headed by Hussein Ali Khalil Al-Sultani.

See also
Politics of Iraq

References

External links
 Official Website

Politics of Iraq
Government of Iraq
Institutions of the Iraqi Council of Ministers